Giorgia Rossi (born 5 June 1987) is an Italian journalist and television presenter.

Biography 
Rossi was born in Rome on 5 June 1987. She studied in the Liceo scientifico and then at Jurisprudence, without completing her studies. She later enrolled as a publicist in the Lazio order of journalists, and at the age of 20 began to work for the thematic channel Roma Channel. She moved first to Sky, then to Rai Sport. From October 2013, she worked for Mediaset as a correspondent for the television program Tiki-Taka. Later she worked for Studio Sport, and finally the management of the pre and post-match UEFA Champions League on Mediaset Premium and that of Domenica Premium, a program that broadcasts Serie A matches on Premium Sport every Sunday morning. She led the pre and post-match of the 2018 FIFA World Cup on Mediaset and she was a regular guest on the Balalaika – Dalla Russia col pallone program. From 2019 she led "Pressing Champions League" on Italia 1, and from January 2020 she led "Pressing Serie A" on Rete 4.  In June 2021, she left Mediaset joining DAZN.

References

External links 

1987 births
Living people
Italian journalists
Journalists from Rome
Italian television presenters
Mass media people from Rome